Roger Cooper is a British businessman. He was imprisoned in Iran from 1985 to 1991 on espionage charges.

Cooper moved to Iran in 1958. He learned to speak fluent Persian and worked in various jobs there over the years.

Iranian authorities arrested Cooper on 7 December 1985, allegedly for overstaying his visa. Subsequently, he was convicted of spying and received a sentence of ten years in prison and the death penalty.

Cooper was jailed in Iran's Evin Prison. Iran released him on 2 April 1991 and he returned to England.

Cooper told reporters upon arrival at Heathrow Airport: “Anyone like me who has been educated at an English public school and then served in the ranks of the British army is quite at home in a Third World prison."

Following his release, Cooper suffered from posttraumatic stress disorder. He returned to doing work as a freelance journalist and then transitioned to running a holiday business in Spain.

Cooper wrote a memoir on his experiences in Iran titled Death Plus Ten Years, which was published by HarperCollins in 1993.

See also
 List of foreign nationals detained in Iran
 Iran–United Kingdom relations

References

Year of birth missing (living people)
Living people
20th-century British businesspeople
British people imprisoned in Iran
Inmates of Evin Prison
People with post-traumatic stress disorder